Domingo Faustino Sarmiento Airport  is an airport in San Juan Province, Argentina, serving the city of San Juan. It is named after Domingo Faustino Sarmiento, the seventh President of Argentina.

Planning to build San Juan Airport started on 15 February 1958. The plans were authorized in 1961, and construction started in 1971. It was almost finished by 1977, but was destroyed in the 1977 San Juan earthquake. Reconstruction occurred between 1977 and 1980, and the new airport was inaugurated on 25 February 1981. It is operated by Aeropuertos Argentina 2000.

Airlines and destinations

Statistics

References

External links 
FallingRain - San Juan Airport

Organismo Regulador del Sistema Nacional de Aeropuertos

Airports in Argentina